Rodney Lawrence (born 8 August 1954) is an Australian cricketer. He played in eight first-class matches for Queensland between 1974 and 1983.

See also
 List of Queensland first-class cricketers

References

External links
 

1954 births
Living people
Australian cricketers
Queensland cricketers
Cricketers from Brisbane